"9:20 Special" is a 1941 jazz standard. It was written by Earle Warren, Jack Palmer and William Engvick.

Recordings
Count Basie recorded the original (3:13) on April 10, 1941 and it was released on OKeh 6244 in 1941
Art Tatum recorded a version (2:29) on October 26, 1945 for Armed Forces Radio and released later on Storyville Live Performances 1934-1956 
Harry James recorded a version in 1945 on Columbia Records
Woody Herman recorded it in 1956 on "Jackpot" - the Las Vegas Herd Capitol Records

See also
List of jazz standards

References

1940s jazz standards
1941 songs
Songs with lyrics by William Engvick
Songs written by Jack Palmer (composer)

Jazz standards
Jazz compositions in C major